The 1983 Italian Open was a tennis tournament that was played by men on outdoor clay courts at the Foro Italico in Rome, Italy and was part of the 1983 Volvo Grand Prix. The women's tournament was played on outdoor clay courts in Perugia, Italy and was part of the 1983 Virginia Slims World Championship Series. The men's tournament was held from 16 through 22 May 1983 while the women's tournament was played from 2 through 8 May 1983. Jimmy Arias and Andrea Temesvári won the singles titles.

Finals

Men's singles
 Jimmy Arias defeated  José Higueras 6–2, 6–7, 6–1, 6–4
 It was Arias' 2nd title of the year and the 3rd of his career.

Women's singles

 Andrea Temesvári defeated  Bonnie Gadusek 6–1, 6–0
 It was Temesvári's 1st title of the year and the 1st of her career.

Men's doubles
 Francisco González /  Víctor Pecci defeated  Jan Gunnarsson /  Mike Leach 6–2, 6–7, 6–4
 It was González's 2nd title of the year and the 5th of his career. It was Pecci's 3rd title of the year and the 20th of his career.

Women's doubles

 Virginia Ruzici /  Virginia Wade defeated  Ivanna Madruga-Osses /  Catherine Tanvier 6–3, 2–6, 6–1
 It was Ruzici's 1st title of the year and the 17th of her career. It was Wade's only title of the year and the 15th of her career.

References

External links
 ATP Tournament Profile
 WTA Tournament Profile

 
Italian Open
Italian Open
Italian Open (tennis)
May 1983 sports events in Europe